Herbert "Herb" James Gavin (15 November 1921 in Winterset, Iowa – 27 June 2009 in California) was an American Chief Test Pilot in the United States Army Air Forces during World War II. He retired on 1 June 1978 as Major General.  He is buried in Arlington National Cemetery.

Awards
 Command Pilot Badge
 Air Force Distinguished Service Medal with bronze oak leaf cluster
 Silver Star Medal
 Legion of Merit
 Distinguished Flying Cross
 Bronze Star Medal
 Meritorious Service Medal
 Air Medal with 7 oak leaf clusters
 Air Force Commendation Medal with oak leaf cluster
 Presidential Unit Citation
 Air Force Outstanding Unit Award with oak leaf cluster
 Combat Readiness Medal

Other honors
A chapter of the 82nd Airborne Division Association is named for General Gavin.

Sources

 Military Times/Hall of Valor
 US Air Force Website

1921 births
2009 deaths
People from Winterset, Iowa
United States Army Air Forces personnel of World War II
Burials at Arlington National Cemetery
Recipients of the Air Force Distinguished Service Medal
Recipients of the Legion of Merit
Recipients of the Silver Star
Recipients of the Distinguished Flying Cross (United States)
United States Army Air Forces generals
Military personnel from Iowa